Germany was represented by Inge Brück, with the song "Anouschka", at the 1967 Eurovision Song Contest, which took place on 8 April in Vienna. As in 1966 the German entry was chosen internally, rather than through a public final, by broadcaster HR.

Before Eurovision

Internal selection 
145 songs were submitted to the selection. A jury presided by Hans-Otto Grünefeldt, TV program director of HR, selected "Anouschka" at the Broadcasting House Dornbusch, the site which also served as venue for the Eurovision Song Contest 1957. The winning song was announced on 5 January 1967.

At Eurovision 
On the night of the final Brück performed ninth in the running order, following Finland and preceding Belgium. Voting in 1967 reverted to the system of 10-member national juries with one vote per member, and at the close of voting "Anouschka" had received 7 points (unusually, via 1 point apiece from seven different countries), placing Germany joint 8th (with Sweden and Yugoslavia) of the 17 entries. The German jury awarded its highest mark (4) to Ireland.

"Anouschka" was a sizeable hit in German-speaking markets, and remains one of the better-remembered German Eurovision entries of the 1960s.

Voting

References 

1967
Countries in the Eurovision Song Contest 1967
Eurovision